{{Speciesbox
| status = LC
| status_system = IUCN3.1
| status_ref = 
| taxon = Oxynoemacheilus evreni| authority = (Erk’akan, Nalbant & Özeren, 2007)
| synonyms = Schistura evreni Erk’akan, Nalbant & Özeren, 2007
}}Oxynoemacheilus evreni is a species of Cypriniformes fish in the genus Oxynoemacheilus''. It is widespread and locally abundant within the Ceyhan drainage where it can be found in streams and rivers which have a gravel substrate in a relatively fast to very fast current. It may have undergone a slight reduction in population due to the construction of dams but it is able to tolerate some habitats which have been altered by humans.

The fish is named in honor of the son, Evren Erk’akan (b. 1987) of the senior author.

References 

evreni
Endemic fauna of Turkey
Fish described in 2007
Taxa named by Füsun Erk'akan
Taxa named by Teodor T. Nalbant
Taxa named by Cevher Özeren
Taxobox binomials not recognized by IUCN